Alon Cohen may refer to:

 Alon Cohen (born in Israel, 1962), co-founder of VocalTec Communications Inc.
 Alon Nisim Cohen (born in Israel, 1968), founder of CyberArk Software Ltd.